Easterbrook is a surname from Devon, England. Notable people with the surname include: 

 Arthur Easterbrook, World War I flying ace and WW2 Brigadier General
 Don Easterbrook, geologist
 Edmund P. Easterbrook, 2nd Chief of Chaplains of the US Army
 Frank H. Easterbrook, American judge
 Gregg Easterbrook, writer
 Leslie Easterbrook, actress
 Steve Easterbrook (born 1967), British businessman, ex-CEO of McDonald's
 Syd Easterbrook, English golfer

See also
 James Easterbrooks (c. 1757–1842), Canadian politician
 Esterbrook, Wyoming
 Dude Esterbrook, American baseball player